Sarba is a town located in the Keserwan District of the   Keserwan-Jbeil Governorate in Lebanon.

History
In 1838, Eli Smith noted  Serba as a village located in "Aklim el-Kesrawan, Northeast of Beirut; the chief seat of the Maronites".

See also
Jounieh, nearby coastal city; article includes historical data about Sarba

References

Bibliography

 

Populated places in Keserwan District